Bill Adair is the founder of the Pulitzer Prize-winning website PolitiFact and Knight Professor of the Practice of Journalism and Public Policy at Duke University, where he specializes in journalism and new media, with an emphasis on structured journalism and fact-checking.   He is a former adjunct faculty member at the Poynter Institute in St. Petersburg, Fla. and a contributing editor at PolitiFact.

Journalism career 
Adair earned a Bachelor of Science from Arizona State University in 1985., after which he spent his career in journalism with the Tampa Bay Times (formerly the St. Petersburg Times), where he served as a reporter and editor.  In 1997 he was assigned to the Washington bureau where he covered Congress, the White House, the Supreme Court, national politics and aviation safety.

In 2004 he was appointed Washington Bureau Chief, a position he held until his transition into academia in 2013. In 2002, Adair's experience in covering aviation safety led him to author and publish "The Mystery of Flight 427: Inside a Crash Investigation," a behind-the-scenes account of a National Transportation Safety Board investigation of the crash of a US Air Boeing 737 near Pittsburgh.  In writing the book, Adair was granted access to the five-year inquiry by the National Transportation Safety Board (NTSB).

In 2007, Adair launched PolitiFact as a pilot project of the Tampa Bay Times, a national fact-checking site that has expanded to include 10 state-level sites and has served as a model for the proliferation of fact-checking sites across the globe.  PolitiFact is known for its "Truth-O-Meter", which rates officials' public statements on a scale ranging from "True" to "Pants On Fire.”  In 2009 the PolitiFact team was awarded the Pulitzer Prize for National Reporting.  Thanks to support from the John S. and James L. Knight Foundation, Adair was also able to create the "Settle It! PolitiFact's Argument Ender” mobile app and conduct research on fact-checking as a faculty member at Duke University.

Academic career

Professorships 
Adair is a former adjunct faculty member at the Poynter Institute, and in 2013 was appointed Knight Professor of the Practice of Journalism and Public Policy at Duke University, one of 25 Knight Chairs at universities around the country.  The John S. and James L. Knight Foundation is an American private, non-profit foundation dedicated to supporting "transformational ideas that promote quality journalism, advance media innovation, engage communities and foster the arts.”

"Bill is a digital journalist with the courage to set audacious goals and take big risks," said Eric Newton, senior adviser to the president at the John S. and James L. Knight Foundation, "He understands the urgent need to try new things, learn, and try again."
According to Duke University, “The Knight Chair at Duke was established in 1990 by a gift from the Knight Foundation, which has established two dozen endowed chairs in journalism at top universities nationwide to teach innovative classes, create experimental projects and new programs and help lead journalism excellence in the digital age.”

Research

The Duke Reporters' Lab 
In 2013 Adair replaced Sarah Cohen, a Pulitzer Prize-winning Washington Post reporter, as the director the Duke Reporters’ Lab, described by Duke as “an online forum for journalism innovation.”  Under Adair's leadership, The Duke Reporters’ Lab has shifted its focus to structured journalism and fact-checking.  Adair has said he would “like to continue experimenting with things that really take the power of the web and mobile devices in presenting information in new ways."

Accolades 
 Pulitzer Prize for National Reporting (shared)
 Manship Prize for New Media in Democratic Discourse
 Everett Dirksen Award for Distinguished Coverage of Congress

References

External links
 

American newspaper reporters and correspondents
Tampa Bay Times
Duke University faculty
Living people
Arizona State University alumni
Year of birth missing (living people)